Antonio Sanz Lozano (2 June 1622 – 1688) was a Spanish-born prelate of the Catholic Church in the Viceroyalty of Peru in what is now Colombia. From 1661 to 1680, he served as bishop of Cartagena, and from 1680 until his death in 1688, as archbishop of Santafé en Nueva Granada (now the Archdiocese of Bogotá).

Biography 
Sanz was born on 2 June 1622 in Cabanillas del Campo, Spain.

On 19 June 1659, Sanz was appointed bishop of Cartagena by Pope Alexander VII, at the age of 37. Located in the Viceroyalty of Peru in South America, the Diocese of Cartagena is located in what is now Colombia. He was confirmed as bishop on 10 November 1659. His episcopal consecration took place on 24 March 1661, with Bishop of Cusco Agustín Muñoz Sandoval as principal consecrator.

On 19 August 1680, Sanz was appointed archbishop of Santafé en Nueva Granada (today the Archdiocese of Bogotá). His term as archbishop began on 22 January 1681. The next year, in 1681, a dispute occurred between the archbishop and President Castillo of New Granada, who ended up banishing Sanz and seizing his powers, to which Sanz responded by excommunicating Castillo.

Sanz died on 28 May 1688, aged 65.

Episcopal succession
While bishop, he was the principal consecrator of:
Francisco de la Trinidad Arrieta, Bishop of Santa Marta (1662); 
Melchor de Liñán y Cisneros, Bishop of Santa Marta (1665); 
Alfonso Bernardo de los Ríos y Guzmán, Bishop of Santiago de Cuba (1669); 
Lucas Fernández de Piedrahita, Bishop of Santa Marta (1669); 
Antonio de León y Becerra, Bishop of Panamá (1673); and
Gregorius Jacobus Pastrana, Bishop of Santa Marta (1685).

Episcopal lineage 
 Bishop Agustín Muñoz Sandoval
 Archbishop Antonio Sanz Lozano (1661)

References

External links and additional sources
 (for Chronology of Bishops) 
 (for Chronology of Bishops) 
 (for Chronology of Bishops) 
 (for Chronology of Bishops) 

1622 births
People from Guadalajara, Spain
Spanish emigrants to Colombia
Spanish Roman Catholic bishops in South America
17th-century Roman Catholic archbishops in New Granada
Roman Catholic bishops of Cartagena in Colombia
Roman Catholic archbishops of Bogotá
1688 deaths